David Christiana is an American artist. He was born in Huntington, New York, has illustrated more than twenty picture books for children and authored four for international publishers such as Farrar, Straus & Giroux; Harcourt Brace; Little, Brown; Henry Holt; and Scholastic. Reviews of his work have appeared in The New York Times Book Review, People Magazine, Publishers Weekly, etc.

Novels 
 Drawer in a Drawer
 White Nineteens
 A Tooth Fairy's Tale
 The First Snow

External links 
 

American children's writers
Living people
American illustrators
Year of birth missing (living people)